Mildren may refer to:
Dean Mildren, a Judge
Frank T. Mildren, a general
Jack Mildren, a quarterback
John Mildren, an Australian politician
Paul Mildren, a Minor League Baseball pitcher
Mildren (racing cars), a series of racing vehicles constructed for Australian racing team owner Alec Mildren during the 1960s and early 1970s.